Eupithecia relativa is a moth in the family Geometridae. It is found in Iran.

References

Moths described in 1982
relativa
Moths of the Middle East